A computon is a combined unit of computing power, including processor cycles, memory, disk storage and bandwidth.  The term was proposed in 2005 by researchers at Hewlett Packard, with the word being a cross between "computation" and "photon", the name for a packet of electromagnetic energy.  HP hopes that the computon will become the computing industry's equivalent to public utility's watt-hour.

See also
 Computron
 Grid computing
 Distributed computing
Computronium

References
 Who wants to buy a computon?, The Economist, 12 March 2005 Grid computing: Electricity is sold by the kilowatt-hour. Now a researcher has proposed that computing power should be sold by the computon
 HP takes new pricing path for utility-based computing  It plans to measure on-demand IT services with a 'computon' metric, Thomas Hoffman, May 26, 2003, Computerworld

External links
 Sun Power Units

Computer performance